The town of Limantepe, sometimes spelled Liman Tepe, located on Turkey's western coast is the site of a prehistoric (Bronze Age) settlement that includes an ancient port dating from 2500 years located underwater offshore. The area is situated in the urban zone of the coastal town of Urla near İzmir. In pre-classical antiquity and during the Hellenistic and Roman eras, it was a Greek town called Larisa.

The harbor settlement was inhabited starting from 6000 years ago and was equipped with a fortification wall partially submerged in the sea. The settlement changed significantly over time, and is one of the oldest known artificial harbors in the Aegean Sea. The underwater find includes vessels and urns that are believed to have arrived at the port from Greece and maybe Cyprus via the Black Sea.

The archaeological site was discovered by Ekrem Akurgal in 1950, and its exploration has been pursued on land and underwater since 1979 by an international team and many of the artifacts discovered are currently on display in İzmir Archaeology Museum. It is very close but separate from the site of Klazomenai, inhabited as of the Iron Age and which itself had changed location several times during its history in the same area between the mainland and Karantina Island across its coastline. Israeli archaeologists and divers including students from Haifa University have helped investigate.

Cultural layers
Three important cultural layers apart from those of the classical period have been encountered at Limantepe up to the present, as well as evidence for the presence of Chalcolithic remains. The lowest layer belongs to the Early Bronze Age and dates from the 3rd millennium B.C. onwards. Three phases of this layer have been excavated so far and the number of phases is expected to increase as the excavations proceed.

Early Bronze Anatolian Trade Network
The ancient settlement of Kastri on Syros island belongs to the Kastri culture from the early Bronze Age in Greece, dating to the period ca. 2500–2200 BC.

This Kastri settlement, belonging to this period, shows numerous cultural connection with Limantepe. This was an intermediary in the trade that went from Limantepe towards the Cyclades. 

Kastri has a similar fortification system with horseshoe-shaped bastions as Limantepe.

The pottery assemblage from Kastri is also very similar to that found in Limantepe and elsewhere in Anatolia at the time. The depas vessels, the bell-shaped cups, and incised pyxides "are entirely Anatolian in character". The tin bronzes are also quite similar.

This trade network went through the whole of Anatolia, as well as Thrace, and towards the Mesopotamia.

Evidence from this early period in Limantepe also indicates cultural ties with the nearby prehistoric sites of Tepekule, Bayraklı within the city of İzmir (which was later to form the core of "Old Smyrna") and with Panaztepe site at the mouth of the River Gediz (later Hermus during the Classical Age). Also there are clear connections with Cyprus.

Middle Bronze Age
Some of these cultural ties continued also in the Middle Bronze Age.

The second cultural layer of Limantepe consists of five phases that belong to the Middle Bronze Age and which dates from the first half of the 2nd millennium B.C. onwards.

The third layer belongs to the Late Bronze Age and covers the time period from the 14th to the 13th century B.C., roughly contemporary with the Trojan War. Some of the artifacts discovered from this period reflect a cultural proximity with the Mycenean culture.

Consequently, along with remains from the Classical Age in Klazomenai, Limantepe reflects a history of 4000 years. It is argued that this could make Limantepe the oldest, as well as the longest inhabited center of the Aegean coast of Anatolia. One of the most important finds at the site was made in 2007 when a wooden merchant ship anchor dating from the 7th century B.C. and which is likely to be the oldest ever found, was discovered wedged in the sea ground during the underwater explorations of Limantepe.

References

Resources

Sources for introductory information

 
 
 

Tells (archaeology)
History of İzmir Province
Urla District
Archaeological sites of prehistoric Anatolia
Ancient Greek archaeological sites in Turkey
Former populated places in Turkey